Darkbloom is a split EP by Canadian musicians Grimes and d'Eon. It was released on April 18, 2011, as a joint release through Grimes' and d'Eon's respective labels, Arbutus Records and Hippos in Tanks. Darkbloom was conceived together by Grimes and d'Eon but recorded separately.

Grimes directed the video for "Vanessa" herself after reportedly being unhappy with the video made for "Crystal Ball". It was Claire Boucher's directorial debut. She also directed and co-starred in the D'Eon video for "Transparency." Both videos were released on the same day in April 2011. Tim Kelly's video for "Crystal Ball" had been filmed earlier but was released in May.

Track listing
Tracks 1–5 performed, written and produced by Grimes. Tracks 6–9 performed, written and produced by d'Eon.

Personnel
Credits adapted from Darkbloom album liner notes.

 Grimes – vocals, producer 
 d'Eon – vocals, producer 
 Jasper Baydala – design
 Sebastian Cowan – additional mixing
 Sadaf Hakimian – photography
 Tyler Los-Jones – insert

Release history

References

External links
 Darkbloom at Arbutus Records
 Darkbloom at Hippos in Tanks

2011 EPs
Grimes albums
Split EPs
Arbutus Records albums